Helion SA is a Polish publisher founded in 1991. It has published over 1,800 IT books, but also publishes business books under the Onepress imprint and psychology books as Sensus. Further brands include Septem, Editio and Dla bystrzaków (For dummies)

Publishing companies of Poland
Publishing companies established in 1991
Book publishing companies of Poland
1991 establishments in Poland